Ahmed ibn al-Mubarak al-Sijilmasi al-Lamati (1679-1743) was the author of Kitab Ad-Dahab al-ibriz min kalam sayyidi Abdellaziz. It was written in 1717. 

This work, commonly known as the Ibriz, is the main source for the teachings of the Moroccan sufi Abd al Aziz al-Dabbagh (died 1719). Al-Dabbagh was an important figure in the tariqa Muhamadiyya.

References
Ahmad B. al-Mubarak Al-lamati (Author), John O'Kane (Translator), Bernd Radtke (Translator), Pure Gold from the Words of Sayyidi Abd al-Aziz al-Dabbagh: Al-Dhabab al-Ibriz min Kalam Sayyidi Abd al-Aziz al-Dabbagh (Basic Texts of Islamic Mysticism)

1679 births
1743 deaths
17th-century Berber people
18th-century Berber people
17th-century Moroccan people
18th-century Moroccan people
Berber writers
Moroccan Sufi writers
People from Sijilmasa